Arfon, from the Welsh for Facing Anglesey, refers to the southern shore of the Menai Strait, the part of mainland Wales closest to the island of Anglesey. It may refer to:

Places
 District of Arfon, an administrative subdivision of Gwynedd county (1974–1996)
 Arfon (Senedd constituency) (2007–present)
 Arfon (UK Parliament constituency) (2010–present)
 Arfon transmitting station, a radio and television mast near Caernarfon
 Cantref Arfon, an administrative division of the Kingdom of Gwynedd (until 1284)

People
 Arfon Griffiths (born 1941), Welsh footballer
 Arfon Haines Davies (born 1948), Welsh television presenter
 Arfon Jones, Welsh Police and Crime Commissioner for North Wales Police
 Arfon Williams (born 1958), Welsh Anglican priest

Other
 Arfon (hymn tune), a traditional Welsh hymn tune
 HMT Arfon, a WWI Royal Navy minesweeper; now a protected wreck in the English Channel